Andrew Reich is an American producer and screenwriter. He was an executive producer for the last three seasons of the American sitcom television series Friends, alongside Scott Silveri, Shana Goldberg-Meehan and Ted Cohen. Reich created the television series Work It with Ted Cohen. He also won a Primetime Emmy Award and was nominated for three more in the category Outstanding Comedy Series.

References

External links 

Living people
Place of birth missing (living people)
Year of birth missing (living people)
American male television writers
American television writers
American television producers
American male screenwriters
20th-century American screenwriters
21st-century American screenwriters
Primetime Emmy Award winners